The 2015 Greek Cup Final was the 71st final of the Greek Football Cup. It took place on 23 May 2015 at Olympic Stadium, between Olympiacos and Skoda Xanthi. It was Olympiacos' 38th Greek Cup Final in their 90 years of existence and Skoda Xanthi's first-ever Greek Cup Final of their 48-year history.

Venue

This was the 22nd Greek Cup Final held at the Athens Olympic Stadium, after the 1983, 1984, 1985, 1986, 1987, 1988, 1989, 1990, 1993, 1994, 1995, 1996, 1999, 2000, 2002, 2009, 2010, 2011, 2012, 2013 and 2014 finals.

The Athens Olympic Stadium was built in 1982 and renovated once in 2004. The stadium is used as a venue for AEK Athens and was used for Olympiacos, Panathinaikos and the Greece national team on various occasions. Its current capacity is 69,618 and it hosted three UEFA European Cup/Champions League Finals in 1983, 1994 and 2007, a UEFA Cup Winners' Cup Final in 1987, the 1991 Mediterranean Games and the 2004 Summer Olympics.

Background
Prior to 2015, Olympiacos had reached the Greek Cup Final 37 times, winning 26 of them. The last time they played in a final was in 2013, when they defeated Asteras Tripolis 3–1 after extra time.

Skoda Xanthi never reached a previous Cup Final.

Route to the final

Match

Details

References

2015
Cup Final
Greek Cup Final 2015
2010s in Athens
Sports competitions in Athens
May 2015 sports events in Europe